Arenas Club de Getxo is a Spanish football club based in the town of Getxo, near Bilbao, in the autonomous community of Basque Country. Founded in 1909, it currently plays in Segunda División RFEF – Group 2, holding home games at Campo Municipal de Gobela, with a 2,000-seat capacity. They were winners of the 1919 Copa del Rey, beating FC Barcelona 5–2.

It was among the pioneering clubs of Spanish football, and in 1928 was a founding member of La Liga, alongside neighbouring Athletic Bilbao, Real Sociedad and Real Unión.  Only Real Unión has remained a consistent rival since then due to both of their downfalls from the top flight.

History

Origins of local football 
The area of Greater Bilbao was deeply connected to Britain due to its iron ore mines and industry. Don Manuel, a priest in the local parish of the Las Arenas neighborhood, would gift balls to local children during Catechism lessons. Some of these boys would go on to study in England and learn about the local game of football. After their return to Getxo, they spread football to nearby neighborhoods.

By 1901, weekly matches were played in the fields of Lamiako by youth from Las Arenas. In 1903 the same group would win the "Copa Athletic", the biggest local tournament at the juvenile level, as well as play a match against Club Ciclista de San Sebastián, the precursor to Real Sociedad. They eventually founded a local team in 1909 (encouraged by the recent creation of the Spanish Federation of Football Clubs) with the name of Arenas Football Club. It was renamed to Club Arenas three years later.

In 1914 they moved their home ground to the local sports club Real Club Jolaseta in the Neguri neighborhood.

Early successes 
In 1912 they started competing in the Campeonato Norte along with Real Sociedad, Athletic Bilbao, Racing de Santander, Sporting de Gijón and Celta de Vigo, being crowned champion in 1917. 

During the 1916-17 season of the Campeonato, all the teams except for Arenas, Athletic, and Real Unión were suspended. The sporting committee of the tournament decided to play only the remaining matches between these three teams. Jolastokieta, one of the suspended teams, was dissolved that year. Arenas lost one match and won another against Unión as well as beating Athletic twice to claim the title. They then beat Sporting de Gijón in the semifinals. This qualified them to that year's Copa del Rey, where it reached the final in Barcelona, losing 1–2 against Madrid FC after extra time. 

In 1917 a knock-out match in the Spanish Cup between Arenas and Athletic Bilbao had to be suspended after the pitch was stormed by Athletic supporters who were looking to assault the referee for seeming biased against their team.

In 1919 Arenas won another regional competition, the Campeonato de Vizcaya, thus qualifying for the Copa del Rey again, and won the national tournament after defeating FC Barcelona 5–2 in the final, scoring three in extra time. The following year, when the Spain national team were runners-up at their international debut in the Olympic Games, the squad included three players from the club, Francisco Pagazaurtundúa, Félix Sesúmaga, and Pedro Vallana.

Arenas Getxo appeared in Spanish Cup finals on two further occasions, losing against Barcelona in 1925 (0–2) and two years later against Real Unión (0–1), the latter in the only all-Basque decisive match in the competition's history not to feature Athletic Bilbao. Every member of the Spanish squad at the 1928 Olympics was with a Basque club, and Arenas provided four of the players.

Decline 
After playing in La Liga's first seven editions – finishing third in 1929–30 – and the following six seasons in the second division, the club has spent the vast majority of its existence competing at the fourth level, with the occasional visit to the regional leagues. In 2015, Arenas gained promotion to the third tier for the first time in 35 years, via the playoffs.

Season to season

 

7 seasons in La Liga
6 seasons in Segunda División
7 seasons in Segunda División B
2 seasons in Segunda División RFEF
61 seasons in Tercera División

In regional system

Current squad

Honours
Copa del Rey: 1919
Runners-up (3): 1917, 1925, 1927
Tercera División (3): 1945–46, 1946–47, 1959–60
North Regional Championship: 1916–17
Biscay Championship (3): 1918–19, 1921–22, 1926–27
Copa Vasca: 1935–36

Famous players
 Delmiro
 Gorka Luariz
 Tomas Agirre
 Guillermo Gorostiza
 Rafael Eguzkiza
 Javier Iturriaga
 Raimundo Lezama
 Joseba del Olmo
 Félix Sesúmaga
 Ian Uranga
 José María Yermo
 José María Zárraga

Famous coaches
 Javier Clemente

References

Morbo: The Story of Spanish Football (2003), Phil Ball.

External links
Official website 
Futbolme team profile 

 
Sport in Biscay
Football clubs in the Basque Country (autonomous community)
Association football clubs established in 1909
Copa del Rey winners
1909 establishments in Spain
Getxo
Segunda División clubs
La Liga clubs